Harry Bradshaw is an English World Cup winning former professional rugby league footballer who played in the 1950s.

Club career
Bradshaw played for Dewsbury until December 1953, when he was signed by Huddersfield. He then returned to Dewsbury in November 1957.

International honours
Harry Bradshaw won a cap for England while at Dewsbury in 1953 against Other Nationalities.

Bradshaw was also selected for the Great Britain squad while at Huddersfield for the 1954 Rugby League World Cup in France. However, he did not participate in any of the four matches, with Sam Smith playing as Hooker in all four matches.

References

External links
Search for "Bradshaw" at rugbyleagueproject.org

Dewsbury Rams players
England national rugby league team players
English rugby league players
Huddersfield Giants players
Living people
Place of birth missing (living people)
Rugby league hookers
Year of birth missing (living people)